Lapido Media - Centre for Religious Literacy in World Affairs is a British-based ‘philanthromedia’ charity, founded by journalists to "advocate for greater awareness of the faith dimension in policy, governance, and conflict."

The Lapido website provides examples of religiously literate journalism, written by stringers across the world. Topics have included Human Trafficking, Religious Freedom and Feminism. Lapido believe the rich can do little to change the world for the poor unless they learn the language of faith. The charity is founded on the belief that many news stories do not make sense without understanding religion.

History 

Dr Jenny Taylor founded Lapido Media  in 2005 leaving her position as Head of Media for the Church Mission Society in London. In 2002 she set up and ran the Break the Silence Campaign to draw the world's attention to 17 years of civil war in Northern Uganda which particularly targeted children.  The campaign was commended in the British parliament in 2004. Harnessing the concern and prayer of 400 British churches to international agencies as well as working strategically with the mainstream media – one of Bob Geldof’s six Africa films for Live Aid was made in Kitgum  - resulted in the tripling of United Nations aid to Northern Uganda and contributed to a reduction in hostilities and the eventual break-up of Internally Displaced Persons (IDP) camps. After witnessing how religiously literate journalism could generate social and spiritual capital, and inspired by theologian Lesslie Newbigin’s call to a ‘radical encounter with secular culture’, Dr Taylor and Squadron Leader Mike Holdsworth, career officer in the Royal Air Force, founded Lapido to help the media "tell a truer story".

Dr Taylor befriended Newbigin when she met him as a student in 1988 at the Selly Oak Federation of Colleges of which he was then President.  She joined the management committee of the influential British Council of Churches Gospel and our Culture Programme – despite never having read a theology book – and went on to work with Newbigin until his death in 1998.  She edited his last papers and co-wrote Faith and Power: Christianity and Islam in ‘Secular’ Britain with him (SPCK 1998). Dr Taylor also credits an article by The Times columnist Bernard Levin as contributing to the founding of Lapido Media. After casting doubt on the persecution of Christians around the world in a column in the early 90s, Levin received a mass of evidence to the contrary from Dr Taylor and, independently, Patrick Sookhdeo of Barnabas Fund. This resulted in Levin doing a series of pieces about persecution of Christians beginning with "Islam's Fearful Bloodletting" on 23 March 1993. Shocked by what she described as "media blindness",  Dr Taylor eventually went on to found Lapido, the first organisation to incorporate the expression “religious literacy” in its brand.

Vision 
Lapido means to "speak up" in the Acholi dialect of Northern Uganda. The charity aims to advocate for people whose beliefs are incomprehensible to what is termed the "secular world". Lapido aim to build bridges of communication between varying world views. The founders believe an informed understanding of religion is essential to community cohesion, security, development and diplomacy.

Dr Taylor has criticised the Church for ignoring the media and write, "Prostitutes, tramps, gypsies, even politicians get prayed for—but journalists are what you might call ―"a lost people group"." Lapido wants to see the religious angle covered in global affairs, as opposed to more stories about religion. Dr Taylor writes "it is not possible to activate the switches that stop wars and prevent famine without recourse to non-secular language and categories."

Lapido Media believe an epistemic shift in essentially secularist British thought is taking place. This claim is backed up by the advent of religious literacy departments in several universities, as well as nationwide projects funded by government through the EHRC and ESRC to promote religious literacy.

Dr Taylor was invited onto CNN's International Correspondents program where she explained, "All over the world, there are amazing stories crying out to be reported with greater sophistication and greater attention. And the trouble with the media, of course, is that it is too easy to sort of, you know, parachute in, parachute out, and miss the suffering and the roots of the suffering."

Research and Consultancy 
Lapido have offered media strategy consultancy to organisations including Faithworks, The Tropical Health and Education Trust and Kingsbridge Community Sports. They also provide training for civil society organisations and NGOs who are frustrated by a one dimensional public discourse which minimises the role of religion in public life.

Lapido suggested a much stronger integration between Open Doors' news arm, then called Compass Direct, and the parent body which spawned World Watch Monitor (WWM). Having built a strong reputation with think tanks and journalists WWM has now expanded into a strategic news operation under former BBC TV Correspondent Julia Bicknell.

Previous Events

Neutrality or Truth? Reporting Islam post 7/7

The official launch of Lapido Media – a debate for journalists on "Neutrality or Truth? Reporting Islam post 7/7" - was held at the Frontline Club, Paddington on 6 December 2007 - a watering hole for foreign correspondents.  Melanie Phillips, Dominic Lawson, Bishop Michael Nazir-Ali and Aaqil Ahmed (later Head of Religion and Ethics at the BBC) attended.

When Journalists Don't Get Religion

In 2010 Lapido launched Blind Spot: When Journalists Don’t Get Religion for Oxford University Press, with the book's Editor Paul Marshall being interviewed by classicist Tom Holland.

Wholly Political 

In 2010, Lapido piloted Wholly Political seminars which look at the political dimension of religion, beginning with political Islam. They are intended to promote religious literacy and equip communicators and leaders with understanding about Muhammed, the ideology of struggle and the Caliphate today. The day-long training workshops consist of four 90 minute sessions, facilitated by two tutors with input from special guests and time for discussion. More information can be found on Lapido's website.

Textual criticism and Qur'an Manuscripts Book Launch 
In November 2012 Lapido hosted a dinner in London bringing together top scholars to launch Dr Keith Small's Textual Criticism and Qur’anic Manuscripts (Lexington). Professor Francois Déroche from the Sorbonne, Paris; Dr Christopher Melchert from Pembroke College, Oxford; Dr Mehmet Koç from the University of Ankara and Andrew Brown from The Guardian joined other scholars to launch the work. Andrew Rippin at the University of Victoria described it as "the first work to bring out the full implications of several generations of scholarly activity in the area of Qur’anic textual studies."

Reporting the Middle East: Why the truth is getting lost 
Lapido hosted a special media event in association with the Henry Jackson Society on 19 September 2013 in Whitehall, London. Douglas Murray chaired the debate between Bishop Angaelos, Betsy Hiel, Nina Shea and Tom Holland.

The event resulted in coverage around the world including an article by Spectator blogger Ed West.

Tablighi Jamaat Book Launch 
Lapido marked its fifth birthday by launching its first  Handy Book for Journalists on Religion in World Affairs on 27 September 2013.  Based on doctoral research by Zacharias Pieri, the book examines the secretive Islamic group Tablighi Jamaat (TJ) who are behind the media-dubbed "megamosque". There was standing room only at the launch which also featured a celebrity panel headed by the Chair of the Muslim Institute Ziauddin Sardar and UNESCO award-winning photographer Jeremy Hunter whose photographs illustrate the book.

Controversy 
In August 2012 Lapido trustee Tom Holland created a documentary for Channel 4 titled Islam: The Untold Story based on his bestselling book In The Shadow of the Sword. Both the book and documentary proved controversial and provoked criticism from the Islamic Education and Research Academy (IERA) who argued "Tom Holland's assertion that there is no valid historical evidence for the seventh century origins of Islam is historically inaccurate". Ofcom and the broadcaster Channel 4 received an estimated 1200 complaints regarding the program. Channel 4 cancelled a public screening of the documentary at their London headquarters.

Responding to the news, Lapido founder Jenny Taylor defended Holland. She wrote, "...The IERA turns out to be the platform of the controversial convert Sheikh Abduraheem Green, a mixed up cross-culture kid if ever there was one: a public-schoolboy convert to Islam, currently with two wives, and at different times, an advocate of holy war, and hell for Mother Theresa." She said the Daily Mail's decision to pit the IERA against an "award-winning Cambridge-educated historian" in its coverage was "insanely irresponsible".

Taylor added, "He's shown all of us that Islam is interesting enough to be taken seriously. He's refused to stick his head in the sand and play blind about the problems or internal tensions that all thinking Muslims know are there."

References 

 http://www.lapidomedia.com/sites/default/files/resources/Commonwealth-Institute-Journal_Taking-Spirituality-Seriously.pdf

Religious charities based in the United Kingdom